Ptikent is a rural locality (a selo) in Ullugatagsky Selsoviet, Suleyman-Stalsky District, Republic of Dagestan, Russia. The population was 262 as of 2010.

Geography 
Ptikent is located 14 km south of Kasumkent (the district's administrative centre) by road. Tatarkhankent is the nearest rural locality.

References 

Rural localities in Suleyman-Stalsky District